Bobby Reynolds, who was the defending champion, chose to not compete this year.
Taylor Dent won in the final 6–3, 7–6(6), against Ilija Bozoljac.

Seeds

Draw

Finals

Top half

Bottom half

References
 Main Draw
 Qualifying Draw

Knoxville Challenger - Singles
2009 Singles